Oleksandr Mitrofanov (born 1 November 1977) is a footballer who last played as a midfielder for Kazakhstan Premier League side FC Ordabasy.

References

External links

1977 births
Living people
Ukrainian footballers
Ukraine under-21 international footballers
Ukrainian expatriate footballers
SC Tavriya Simferopol players
FC Volyn Lutsk players
FC Aktobe players
FC Anzhi Makhachkala players
FC Ordabasy players
Ukrainian Premier League players
Kazakhstan Premier League players
Expatriate footballers in Kazakhstan
FC Kristall Smolensk players

Association football midfielders